Cressa may refer to:
Cressa (crustacean), a genus of crustaceans
Cressa (plant), a genus of plants
Cressa (Caria), a town of ancient Caria, now in Asian Turkey
Cressa (Paphlagonia), a town of ancient Paphlagonia, now in Asian Turkey
Cressa (Phocis), a town of ancient Phocis, Greece
Cressa, Piedmont, a municipality in Piedmont, Italy
Cressa (Thrace), a town of ancient Thrace, now in European Turkey
 Cressa, a dancer and percussionist with The Stone Roses